Amirul Islam Kamal is a Awami League politician and the former Member of Parliament of Noakhali-14.

Career
Kamal was elected to parliament from Noakhali-14 as an Awami League candidate in 1973.

References

Awami League politicians
Living people
1st Jatiya Sangsad members
2nd Jatiya Sangsad members
Year of birth missing (living people)
People from Hatiya Upazila
21st-century Bengalis